Azeemul Haniff (born 24 October 1977) is a Guyanese cricketer. He played in 51 first-class and 13 List A matches for Guyana from 1996 to 2007.

See also
 List of Guyanese representative cricketers

References

External links
 

1977 births
Living people
Guyanese cricketers
Guyana cricketers